Parashuram is a 1989 Indian Kannada action thriller film directed by V. Somashekar and produced by Parvathamma Rajkumar. The film starred Rajkumar, Mahalakshmi and Vani Viswanath. This was V. Somashekhar's last movie with Rajkumar, who incidentally started his directing career with Rajkumar's Bangaarada Panjara (1974). Also this was last movie of Puneeth Rajkumar as a child actor, who later returned as a fully fledged hero in the movie Appu (2002). The film's score and soundtrack was composed by Hamsalekha.

Plot 
Indian Army Major Parashuram is an ex-army man running a private security agency. He is a happily married to Usha, and leads a good life with his son. He deals with a case where an actress is abducted and the film's producer seeks Parashuram's help. He befriends Appu, who is a slum-dweller. Parashuram comes across an organized crime syndicate, headed by MD, and supported by Purohit, Kulkarni and Nayak. MD is powerful enough to placate governments. He runs short of money to fund the election campaign and gets his mafia network to double the monthly roll-call.

Parashuram gives a good beating to MD's goons. MD is impressed with Parashuram, that someone is able to give him a fight. He invites Parashuram and expresses his wish that Parashuram work for him. Parashuram rejects it outright and walks away. MD threatens to punish and hatches a plan to destroy him. On Parashuram's son's birthday, MD gets Parashuram's son kidnapped. After all efforts to trace the child are done with, Parashuram guesses it must be MD who has abducted his son. He calls up MD to bring his son back. Just then a box arrives for Parashuram, which contains his son's right hand.

When Parashuram speaks back to MD, MD asks Usha to collect her son's body near their house gate. When the child is rushed to hospital, MD succeeds in getting the child killed. Parashuram is suffering under intense grief, when the attending nurse says he has a phone-call. MD cajoles him and says Parashuram would lose his mental balance and says he has lost Usha too. Parashuram finds his wife is being dragged away by MD's henchmen and thrown from the hospital roof. Usha dies immediately, leaving Parashuram alone. With the help of a press reporter and Appu, Parashuram takes the law into his own hands, and starts killing MD's men one after the other, hacking them with a "parashu" (a weapon of Sage Parashurama).

Cast

Soundtrack

Hamsalekha composed the background score for the film and the soundtracks. Lyrics for the soundtracks were penned by Chi. Udaya Shankar, T. P. Kailasam and Hamsalekha. The album consists of five soundtracks. Singer Swarnalatha was introduced to Kannada film industry through this soundtrack. The song "Nagutha Nagutha Baalu" was received extremely well upon release.

Sources

External links 
 

1989 films
1989 action films
1980s Kannada-language films
Films scored by Hamsalekha
Indian action films